The Burnhope Reservoir railway was an industrial narrow gauge railway built to serve the construction of Burnhope Reservoir near Weardale. An extensive network of  narrow gauge lines connected the North Eastern Railway branch terminus at Weardale with the dam construction site.

Locomotives

References

See also
British industrial narrow gauge railways

2 ft gauge railways in England
Reservoir construction railways
Railway lines opened in 1930
Railway lines closed in 1937
Rail transport in County Durham
Stanhope, County Durham